The 2020 Uzbekistan Super League (known as the Coca-Cola Uzbekistan Super League for sponsorship reasons) was the 29th season of top-level football in Uzbekistan since its establishment on 1992. Pakhtakor Tashkent were the defending champions from the 2019 campaign.

Season events
On 16 March, all football competitions in Uzbekistan were postponed due to the COVID-19 pandemic.

On 20 July, the Uzbekistan Super League was suspended for a second time due to COVID-19 pandemic in Uzbekistan, with it being announced on 24 July that the league would resume on 3 August with the scheduled 10th round matches.

Teams

 1 On the back of the strip.

Managerial changes

Foreign players

The number of foreign players is restricted to five per USL team. A team can use only five foreign players on the field in each game.

In bold: Players that have been capped for their national team.

League table

Positions by round

Results

Results by match played

Season Statistics
 First goal of the season: Ivan Solovyov for Navbahor against Pakhtakor

Goalscorers

Hat-tricks

Top assists

Disciplinary

Attendances

By round

By team

Awards

Monthly awards

Match ball
On 23 February 2020, Puma announced their official partnership with Uzbekistan Super League to manufacture the official match ball for the Uzbekistan Professional Football League Organization.

See also
2020 Uzbekistan Pro League 
2020 Uzbekistan Pro-B League 
2020 Uzbekistan Second League
2020 Uzbekistan Cup 
2020 Uzbekistan League Cup

References

Uzbekistan
Uzbekistan Super League seasons
2020 in Uzbekistani football
Uzbekistan Super League